Ilaria Caprioglio (born 4 February 1969, in Varazze) is an Italian politician.

Caprioglio ran as an independent for the office of Mayor of Savona at the 2016 Italian local elections, supported by a centre-right coalition. She won and took office on 22 June 2016.

See also
2016 Italian local elections
List of mayors of Savona

References

External links
 

1969 births
Living people
Mayors of Savona
People from Savona